Herb Joolen (27 August 1890 – 7 September 1967) was an Australian rules footballer who played with Melbourne and South Melbourne in the Victorian Football League (VFL).

Notes

External links 

 
 Herb Joolen on Demonwiki

1890 births
1967 deaths
Australian rules footballers from Melbourne
Melbourne Football Club players
Sydney Swans players
People from Port Melbourne